Brian Deacon (born 13 February 1949) is a British actor, known for portraying Jesus in the 1979 film Jesus, which was made by the evangelical organization the Jesus Film Project. Deacon was chosen for the part out of a field of 900 actors screen tested by producer John Heyman. 

Deacon has also portrayed Heumac in The Feathered Serpent (1976, 1978), Frank Miles in the 1978 TV series Lillie, and appeared with his brother, Eric, in the Peter Greenaway film, A Zed & Two Noughts (1985), as Oswald Deuce. Between 1992 and 1993, he played the role of The Rt Hon. Neil Kincaid in British soap opera Emmerdale, the lover of established character Kim Tate (Claire King).

Personal life
Deacon was born in Oxford, where he later trained at the Oxford Youth Theatre. He has been married twice, firstly to Rula Lenska (1977-1987), with whom he had a daughter, Lara Parker Deacon. In 1998 he married Natalie Bloch.

Filmography

 The Guardians, episode "The Logical Approach" (1971)
 The Triple Echo (1972)
 Love and Mr Lewisham (1972) TV series
 Thirty-Minute Theatre, episode "Scarborough" (1972)
 ITV Sunday Night Theatre, episode "First Sight" (1972)
 Full House, TV series episode of 25 November 1972
 Public Eye, episode "It's a Woman's Privilege" (1973)
 Vampyres (1974)
 The Kiss (1974)
 Good Girl (TV series)|Good Girl, (1974)  TV series 
 Churchill's People, episode "The Lost Island" (1975)
 The Emigrants, episodes "Chances for the Children" (1976), "Endeavour" (1976), "13,000 Miles Away" (1976) e "A Dream of Freedom" (1976)
 Centre Play, 1st episode "Risking It" (1977)
 The Feathered Serpent (1976-1978) TV Series
 Lillie, episodes "Mrs. Langtry" (1978), "The Jersey Lily" (1978), "The New Helen" (1978), "Bertie" (1978), "Let Them Say" (1978), "The Sailor Prince" (1978) e "Going on the Stage" (1978)
 Jesus (1979)
 The New Media Bible: Book of Genesis (1980)
 Leap in the Dark, episode "Watching Me, Watching You" (1980)
 Nelly's Version (1983) TV Film
 The First Part of King Henry VI (1983) TV Film
 The Second Part of King Henry VI (1983) TV Film
 The Third Part of King Henry VI  (1983) TV Film
 Richard III (1983) TV Film
 Separate Tables (1983) TV Film
 Hammer House of Mystery and Suspense, episode "And the Wall Came Tumbling Down" (1984)
 Mr. Palfrey of Westminster, episode "Freedom from Longing" (1985)
 Bleak House (1985) TV series
 A Zed & Two Noughts (1985)
 Screen Two, episode "Inappropriate Behaviour" (1987)
 Emmerdale, episode 1.1724 1.1725 (1992)
 Bugs, episode "Down Among the Dead Men" (1995)
 The Story of Jesus for Children (2000) Home Video only
 Star Wars: Knights of the Old Republic II - The Sith Lords (2004) Video Game (voice)
 Doctors, episodes "Face Value (2001) e "Amends (2009)
 Ceville (2009) Video Game (voice)
 The Projectionist (2012)
 The Night of the Rabbit (2013) Video Game (voice)
 Mistaken (2013)

References

External links
 
 

1949 births
Living people
English Anglicans
English male film actors
English male stage actors
English male television actors
English male voice actors
Male actors from Oxfordshire
actors from Oxford